</noinclude>

MS Sovereign (formerly Sovereign of the Seas) was one of three large cruise ships of the  operated by Pullmantur Cruises and formerly by Royal Caribbean International. When she was completed in 1987, Sovereign of the Seas was the world's largest passenger ship. On 24 June 2020 Sovereign arrived and was beached at Aliağa, Turkey, where she was dismantled.

History 

She sailed on her maiden voyage on January 16, 1988, and was initially based at the Port of Miami.

In 1998 and 1999, the Royal Caribbean International cruise company was fined US$9 million because Sovereign of the Seas had repeatedly dumped oily waste into the ocean and tried to hide this using false records, including fake piping diagrams given to the US Coast Guard. Because the company was and is incorporated in Liberia, Royal Caribbean argued that this case was not in the jurisdiction of US courts.

Her refurbishment in November 2004 was the subject of the Travel Channel mini-series Dry-Dock, A Cruise Ship Reborn. Throughout her time with Royal Caribbean she sailed cruises to the Bahamas and the Caribbean out of Miami and Port Canaveral, Florida. These cruises visited Coco Cay, one of RCI's privately owned islands, in the Berry Islands group.

In November 2008 Sovereign of the Seas was transferred to the fleet of Pullmantur Cruises, a Royal Caribbean Cruises Ltd subsidiary, and renamed MS Sovereign. Sovereign set sail on its first voyage with Pullmantur Cruises on March 23, 2009. Similar to other ships in the same class, Sovereign had a multi-deck atrium lobby and a top-deck, funnel-mounted lounge with panoramic views of the sea. The ship's facilities included nine bars, five restaurants, four pools, a spa and a casino.

In 2018, the ship was featured in the film Yucatán, filmed by Telecinco Cinema.

According to reports, the interiors of the ships were stripped of "everything of value." On 23 July 2020 she was beached in Aliağa alongside her sistership Monarch, which was beached one day before. Scrapping began in August. Scrapping was finished in February 2021.

See also
 Yucatán, a 2018 Spanish comedy film set on MS Sovereign.
 Dil Dhadakne Do, a 2015 Indian family feature film was set on MS Sovereign.

References

External links

 

 

1987 ships
Ships of Royal Caribbean International
Ships built in France
Ships built by Chantiers de l'Atlantique